Marek Opioła (born 24 September 1976 in Warsaw) is a Polish politician. He was elected to the Sejm on 25 September 2005, with 5,301 votes in 16 Płock district as a candidate from the Law and Justice list. After leaving the Sejm in 2019, Opioła became vice-president of the Supreme Audit Office of Poland. He was appointed to the European Court of Auditors from 1 February 2021 to 6 May 2022 and is nominated for re-election.

See also
Members of Polish Sejm 2005-2007

External links
Marek Opioła - parliamentary page - includes declarations of interest, voting record, and transcripts of speeches
"New ECA Member Marek Opioła (Poland) takes office, European Court of Auditors' press release

1976 births
Living people
Politicians from Warsaw
Law and Justice politicians
Members of the Polish Sejm 2005–2007
Members of the Polish Sejm 2007–2011
Members of the Polish Sejm 2011–2015
Members of the Polish Sejm 2015–2019
Members of the Polish Sejm 2019–2023